The United Democratic Party is a political party in Kenya. It is led by Cyrus Jirongo.

References 

Political parties in Kenya